The Museum of Fine Arts of Álava (Spanish: Museo de Bellas Artes de Álava) is located in Vitoria-Gasteiz, the capital of the Basque Country. Since its opening in 1942, it has undergone many transformations. The museum is dedicated to Spanish art from the 18th to the 20th century and to Basque art from the period 1850–1950.

History

Augustin Zulueta Palace
In 1912, Elvira Zulueta and Ricardo Augustin started the construction of their private residence in the street Fray Francisco; what today is known as the Augustin Zulueta Palace. Elvira, daughter of Julián de Zulueta, belonged to a wealthy family in Vitoria, and after her marriage in 1905 with Ricardo Augustin, they decided to build a mansion in Vitoria's wealthy neighborhood.

The management of the project was entrusted to the architects Julian Apraiz (1876–1962) and Francisco Javier de Luque (1871–1941), who had won the competition for designing Vitoria's new cathedral in 1906.

The work, which was very complex for that time, was completed in 1916. However, in September 1917, Elvira, died suddenly and Ricardo Augustin gradually abandoned the city, leaving the palace empty for much of the year. In 1924 he reached an agreement with the diocese to begin construction of a seminary on part of the property, while he retained the area around the palace. As a thank you, Augustin received the papal title of "Count of Davila" in the 1920s. The count continued to be linked to the province until his death in 1965 and is buried along with his wife in the chapel of the diocesan seminary.

The museum and its collections
The idea of creating a museum in Álava dated back over a century. In 1792 the Royal Basque Society kept a library and a collection of Roman tombstones in the old Seminary Church of Aguirre de Vitoria. In 1844 the civil governor established a "Gallery of Pictures" in a room of the Palace House. At the end of the 19th century, Federico Baraibar had gathered archaeological remains in what he called the "Incipient Museum" in the halls of the secondary school, which later served as the meeting place of the Basque Parliament. In addition, a school of Arts and crafts hosted rooms with works, primarily from local artists.

For years, the local press had urged the creation of a museum, and this is reflected in 1940 with the creation of the Culture Council of the provincial Council of Álava, one of whose main objectives was the establishment and operation of the museum, library and provincial archive. The first step was taken in 1941 with the purchase of the Augustin Zulueta Palace, destined to accommodate, under the name of Casa de Álava, both collections related to fine arts and archaeology as well as the library and the archive of the province. As a museum, the Diocese of Vitoria donated religious art. Other donations came from the Museo del Prado and private individuals.

In 1975, the museum began a systematic process of collecting contemporary art, enriched in the successive decades to constitute one of the most complete and coherent throughout the Spanish State. At the same time, the other large collection of works of this museum, the Basque art, moved for exhibition to a location just opposite the Palace of Ajuria Enea for a brief time, from 1978 to 1980. That year, it became the official residence of the president and funds were returned to the provincial museum. Another prominent date was 1986 when the Diputación Foral de Álava acquired an important collection of playing cards from Félix Alfaro Fournier (1895–1989), which they displayed until the Museum of Fournier de Naipes was incorporated into the new Museo Bibat.

Since 1999, the museum collection has had exhibits ranging from the 13th century to the present day, including a section devoted to numismatics and an open air museum of contemporary sculpture.

At present the Museum of Fine Arts of Álava is divided into four sections, consisting of the original building, the Augustin Zulueta Palace; an area of expansion from the 1960s; and the annex where access to the museum is located. In this renovation, carried out between the years 1999–2001, the whole has been refurbished, architectural barriers have been eliminated and access improved with additional services for visitors.

Current collection
The tour begins in the rooms of the ground floor dedicated to Basque art from 1850 to 1950, where you can see the evolution of the painting on the basis of pioneering artists such as Juan Angel Sáez (1811–1873), Antonio Lecuona, Eduardo Zamacois y Zabala and Jose Etxenagusia, among others. The display continues with the works of innovative artists such as Adolfo Guiard, Darío de Regoyos and Juan de Echevarría, to the most outstanding artists of the period prior to the outbreak of the civil war, such as Julián de Tellaeche (1884–1957).

Also on the first floor, one may find other works by Basque artists; large format works by Ignacio Zuloaga, Aurelio Arteta, Elías Salaverria, Francisco Iturrino and the brothers Ramón and Valentín de Zubiaurre, works in which the traditional artistic languages meet with the most modern.

The second floor is dedicated to Fernando de Amárica, with works donated by his foundation for permanent display. The chronological journey allows you to follow the succession of stylistic trends used throughout his long career (realism, impressionism, expressionism).

Located in the zone corresponding to the Augustin Zulueta Palace, the collection of Spanish art from the 18th to the 20th century, shown through portraits, landscapes and scenes depicting local customs, illustrates the transition from classical and academic painting to more spontaneous romantic styles and painters from the realist movement. The portraits of Vicente López Portaña and Federico and Raimundo de Madrazo, the landscapes of Carlos de Haes, Aureliano de Beruete and the mural sketches of Josep Maria Sert are a good example of this.

External links

Website of the Museo de Bellas Artes de Álava
Website of the Fundación de Amárica
Hidden Gem: Museum of Fine Arts of Álava in Vitoria-Gasteiz, Basque Country, Spain

1942 establishments in Spain
Art museums and galleries in Spain
Art museums established in 1942
Vitoria-Gasteiz
Museums in the Basque Country (autonomous community)